Unnai Naan is a 2008 Indian Tamil language romantic drama film produced and directed by Senthilnathan. The film stars newcomers Viinu and Naash, with Manobala, Sulakshana, Vennira Aadai Moorthy, T. P. Gajendran, Abhinayashree, Bhuvaneswari, Suja Varunee and Shakeela playing supporting roles. The film had musical score by Joe Arulraj and was released on 8 August 2008.

Plot
The film begins with a psychiatrist (Nizhalgal Ravi) uncovering the past of Vijay (Viinu) in his hospital.

Vijay (Viinu) was a carefree youngster who lived with his naive parents (Manobala and Sulakshana). He was not a good-looking person, all his friends had girlfriends and he felt depressed about not having a girlfriend. One day, Vijay saved Jennifer (Naash), a soft-spoken and shy woman, from rowdies who tried to misbehave with her and they fell in love with each other. Later, Vijay introduced Jennifer to his friends and his father but they couldn't see her.

The psychiatrist concludes that Vijay felt into depression and he is now suffering from pseudohallucination: Vijay thinks that Jennifer is real. The psychiatrist tells his father that the only way to cure him is to find him a woman who looks like Jennifer. Naash, a model who looks exactly like Jennifer, comes across Vijay's friends and they beg her to help their friend but she refuses and makes fun of them. Thereafter, Vijay's friends then kidnap her and sequester her in a bungalow, they then bring Vijay to live with her. As the days go by, Naash has no other choice than to act as Jennifer to escape from the place but Vijay eventually finds out that she is not Jennifer and Vijay tells her that his love is pure. The film ends with Naash falling in love with Vijay.

Cast

Viinu as Vijay
Naash as Naash/Jennifer
Manobala as Vijay's father
Sulakshana as Lakshmi, Vijay's mother
Vennira Aadai Moorthy as "Bruce Lee" Bhaskar
T. P. Gajendran
Abhinayashree
Bhuvaneswari
Suja Varunee
Shakeela
Besant Seenu
Shobana
Padmapriya
S. Thangapandian
S. Suresh
Rajgopal
Nizhalgal Ravi as Psychiatrist
Birla Bose as Henchman
Lekhasri in a special appearance
Laksha in a special appearance

Production
Production on the film began in August 2004, with director Senthilnathan's son, Vinod, selected to portray the leading role.

Soundtrack

The film score and the soundtrack were composed by Joe Arulraj. The soundtrack features 5 tracks.

Release
The film was released on 8 August 2008 after many delays and it bombed at the box-office.

References

2008 films
2008 romantic drama films
2000s Tamil-language films
Indian romantic drama films
Films directed by Senthilnathan